George Elbridge Whiting (September 14, 1840 – October 14, 1923) was an American composer of classical music.

Early life and career
George Whiting was born in Holliston, Massachusetts on September 14, 1840. He founded the Beethoven Society in Hartford, Connecticut when he was fifteen years old. He moved to Boston, Massachusetts in 1862 and later to New York City. Whiting was a student of George Washbourne Morgan. He went to Liverpool, England, and studied with William Thomas Best. He later studied in Berlin with Carl August Haupt (harmony), Robert Radecke (orchestration), and others.

Whiting worked in various positions in Albany, New York and Boston. He succeeded John Henry Willcox as organist and choir master at the Church of the Immaculate Conception on the south side of Boston, where he composed his masses in C minor, F minor, and E♭ major.

He married Helen Aldrich on April 30, 1867, and they had one child.

In 1874, Whiting became organist of the Music Hall in Boston, Massachusetts. In 1878 he went to the Music Hall in Cincinnati, Ohio.  During the 1870s he also taught organ to his nephew, composer Arthur Whiting.

Whiting was also for a time head of the organ department in the New England Conservatory. Among his pupils was Henry Morton Dunham.

Death
Whiting died in Jamaica Plain, Boston on October 14, 1923.

Musical works
His compositions include:
Mass in C minor (1872)
Mass in F minor (1874)
Mass in F minor (undated)
Dream Pictures (1874)
The Tale of the Viking (1878 cantata)
Leonora (1893 opera)
Henry of Navarre (cantata)
March of the Monks of Bangor (cantata)
some pieces for orchestra
several songs
music for organ
music for piano

He wrote several published texts, including:
The Organist (Boston, 1870)
The First Six Months on the Organ (Boston, 1871)

References

External links
 

1840 births
1923 deaths
19th-century classical composers
20th-century classical composers
American classical musicians
American male classical composers
American opera composers
American Romantic composers
Male opera composers
People from Holliston, Massachusetts
19th-century American composers
20th-century American male musicians
19th-century American male musicians